Hitra is an island in Hitra municipality in Trøndelag county, Norway. The  island is the 7th largest island in Norway (excluding Svalbard) and it is the largest island south of the Lofoten archipelago. The island lies between the Trondheimsleia strait and the Frøyfjorden, just southwest of the entrance to the Trondheimsfjorden. Hitra is surrounded by many islands such as Smøla to the southwest; Bispøyan, Helgbustadøya, Dolmøya, and Frøya to the north; Ulvøya, Fjellværsøya, and Leksa to the east; and Hemnskjela and the mainland of Norway to the south.

Most of the island's residents live near the coastline.  The largest villages on the island are Fillan, Sandstad, Hestvika, Kvenvær, Ansnes, and Melandsjøen.

In 2004, Statkraft completed the construction of the Hitra Wind Farm on the island.

The island is now all a part of the municipality of Hitra, but prior to 1965, the island was divided into four municipalities: Hitra, Fillan, Sandstad, and Kvenvær.

See also
List of islands of Norway

References

Islands of Trøndelag
Hitra